Pedro Pineda (born 30 November 1971) is a Mexican former professional footballer who played as a forward. He was a member of the Mexico national football team competing at the 1992 Summer Olympics in Barcelona, Spain.

Pineda was one of the first Mexican football players to join a Serie A club, which was AC Milan in 1991. He was signed by the club after the FIFA U-20 World Cup in 1991. After an unsuccessful stint in Milan, where he played a few league games despite his five-year contract, he returned to Mexico where he played for a number of teams in the Mexican 1st Division. He made his debut for Chivas Guadalajara in the 1991–1992 season at the age of 19.

A well-traveled player, Pineda represented nine different clubs in the Mexican top flight, some more than once. Perhaps his best year came in 1998, when he scored 11 goals in both the Verano and Invierno tournaments. In that year, he played for Necaxa as the team finished second in the Verano competition and won the Invierno tournament. Pineda also helped Pachuca to a runner-up finish in the Verano 2001 championship.

His last job was related to Mexican football. He coached Lerma in third Mexican professional football league.

References

External links

 BDFA profile

1971 births
Living people
People from Nezahualcóyotl
Footballers from the State of Mexico
Association football forwards
Olympic footballers of Mexico
Footballers at the 1992 Summer Olympics
Mexico under-20 international footballers
Mexico youth international footballers
Liga MX players
C.D. Guadalajara footballers
Club América footballers
Club Necaxa footballers
Atlante F.C. footballers
C.F. Monterrey players
Cruz Azul footballers
C.F. Pachuca players
Club Puebla players
Toros Neza footballers
Mexican footballers